Monarch Mountain is one of the principal summits of the Pacific Ranges subdivision of the Coast Mountains in southern British Columbia.  It stands just east of a pass between the Klinaklini River and the south branch of the Atnarko River, which is a tributary of the Bella Coola River.  Surrounding Monarch Mountain is the Monarch Icefield, the northernmost of the major icefields of the Pacific Ranges, and just south of it is the Ha-Iltzuk Icefield, which is the largest.  Monarch is in the southern end of Tweedsmuir South Provincial Park.

Climate 
The summit of Monarch Mountain has an ice cap climate (EF).

See also
 Geography of British Columbia
 Mountain peaks of North America
 List of Ultras of Canada

References

External links
 
 Monarch Ice Field backcountry ski trip report
 "Monarch Mountain, British Columbia" on Peakbagger

Three-thousanders of British Columbia
Pacific Ranges
Central Coast of British Columbia
Range 2 Coast Land District